Bunratty Upper is a barony in County Clare, Ireland. This ancient geographical division of land is in turn divided into six civil parishes.

Legal context
Baronies were created after the Norman invasion of Ireland as divisions of counties and were used the administration of justice and the raising of revenue. While baronies continue to be officially defined units, they have been administratively obsolete since 1898. However, they continue to be used in land registration and in specification, such as in planning permissions. In many cases, a barony corresponds to an earlier Gaelic túath which had submitted to the Crown.

Landscape
Bunratty Lower is a division of the former barony of Bunratty. This belonged to the Macnamara family, and was called Dangan-i-vigin.
It is bounded to the north by the county of Galway. Within the county of Clare, it is bounded by the baronies of Tulla Upper (to the north-east), Tulla Lower (to the east), Bunratty Lower (to the south), Islands (to the south-west) and by Inchiquin (to the north-west). Lough Cullaunyheeda separates the barony from its neighbour, Tulla Lower.

The land is rocky, but able to support large numbers of sheep.

Parishes and settlements
Upper Bunratty contains the civil parishes of Clooney, Doora, Inchicronan, Kilraghtis, Quin and Templemaley. 
The main population centres are Quin and Crusheen.

References
Citations

Sources

Baronies of County Clare